Kaleybar, Khoda Afarin and Hurand (electoral district) is the 10th electoral district in the East Azerbaijan Province of Iran. This electoral district has a population of 104,903 and elects 1 member of parliament.

1980
MP in 1980 from the electorate of Kaleybar. (1st)
 Matlab Vahid

1984
MP in 1984 from the electorate of Kaleybar. (2nd)
 Ebrahim Abbaspour

1988
MP in 1988 from the electorate of Kaleybar. (3rd)
 Masoud Sadeghi-Azad

1992
MP in 1992 from the electorate of Kaleybar. (4th)
 Khanali Pourgorban

1996
MP in 1996 from the electorate of Kaleybar. (5th)
 Goliollah Golizadeh

2000
MP in 2000 from the electorate of Kaleybar, Khoda Afarin and Hurand. (6th)
 Goliollah Golizadeh

2004
MP in 2004 from the electorate of Kaleybar, Khoda Afarin and Hurand. (7th)
 Arsalan Fathipour

2008
MP in 2008 from the electorate of Kaleybar, Khoda Afarin and Hurand. (8th)
 Arsalan Fathipour

2012
MP in 2012 from the electorate of Kaleybar, Khoda Afarin and Hurand. (9th)
 Arsalan Fathipour

2016

Notes

References

Electoral districts of East Azerbaijan
Kaleybar County
Khoda Afarin County
Deputies of Kaleybar, Khoda Afarin and Hurand